Megastar may refer to:

Megastar (projector), a series of planetarium projectors
MS Megastar, a ro-ro/passenger ferry owned by Tallink AS